The 2010 season was the St. Louis Rams' 73rd in the National Football League, and their 16th in St. Louis. The team greatly improved on their near winless record of 1–15 from the 2009 season by achieving more total victories than in their previous three seasons for a record of 7–9, which almost won a weak NFC West ultimately decided by a loss to the Seahawks in the final week. Since the start of the 2007 NFL season, the Rams had won just 6 combined games and had not qualified for the playoffs since 2004. In the 2010 NFL Draft, the Rams had the number 1 overall pick, which they picked Sam Bradford from Oklahoma. This year marked their second season under head coach Steve Spagnuolo. The Rams played all of their home games at the Edward Jones Dome, in St. Louis, Missouri.

The Rams fired two trainers (Jim Anderson and Dake Walden), and assistant line coach Art Valero left for the Seattle Seahawks.

Stan Kroenke was approved by the NFL on August 25, 2010 to purchase 100% of the Rams from the current owners Chip Rosenbloom and Lucia Rodriguez. Kroenke took control of the team before the start of the 2010 season. He also owns the Denver Nuggets of the NBA, as well as the Colorado Avalanche of the NHL.

Offseason

Key departures

Quarterback Marc Bulger was released by the Rams on April 5, 2010.

Key additions

2010 NFL Draft

The Rams picked first in the first round after finishing the 2009 season with the worst overall record at 1–15. In addition, the Rams had a fifth round pick from the Philadelphia Eagles from a trade that sent LB Will Witherspoon to the Eagles, and a seventh round pick from the Atlanta Falcons from a trade that sent CB Tye Hill to the Falcons.

The Rams selected University of Oklahoma QB Sam Bradford with their 2010 number 1 overall pick.

Preseason

Schedule
The Rams preseason schedule was announced on March 31, 2010.

Game summaries

Week 1: vs Minnesota Vikings

Regular season

Schedule
In addition to their regular games against NFC West division rivals, the Rams played games against the NFC South and AFC West according to the NFL's schedule rotation, and also played games against the Detroit Lions, who had finished last in the NFC North in 2009, and the Washington Redskins, who had finished last in the NFC East in 2009.

Game summaries

Week 1: vs. Arizona Cardinals

The St. Louis Rams began their season at home for an NFC West match against the Arizona Cardinals. The Rams trailed in the 2nd quarter with Cardinals kicker Jay Feely nailing a 22-yard field goal, which was replied when Rams kicker Josh Brown made a 46-yard field goal. The Rams fell behind again with running back Tim Hightower making a 1-yard TD run, but were able to score with rookie quarterback Sam Bradford making a 1-yard TD pass to wide receiver Laurent Robinson. In the third quarter, the Rams took the lead for the first time when Brown nailed a 25-yard field goal, but it went downhill in the fourth quarter when quarterback Derek Anderson made a 21-yard TD pass to wide receiver Larry Fitzgerald, giving St. Louis a loss.

With the loss, St. Louis began the season at 0–1.

Week 2: at Oakland Raiders

Hoping to rebound from their divisional loss to the Cardinals the Rams flew to Oakland–Alameda County Coliseum for an Interconference duel with the Oakland Raiders. In the 2nd quarter the Rams would score first with QB Sam Bradford making a 7-yard TD pass to WR Mark Clayton. Then the Raiders replied with kicker Sebastian Janikowski nailing a 38-yard field goal; then he booted a 41-yard field goal in the third quarter. Then the Rams fell behind when QB Bruce Gradkowski made a 4-yard TD pass to WR Louis Murphy, followed in the fourth quarter by Janikowski nailing a 22-yard field goal. The Rams cut the lead when Bradford found WR Mark Clayton on a 17-yard TD pass, but couldn't pull out the victory.

With the close loss and 13th straight loss to an AFC opponent, the Rams fell to 0–2.

Week 3: vs. Washington Redskins

After two close losses the Rams hoped to bounce back at the Edward Jones Dome for their first win of the season. On the first possession the Rams drove down the field and capped off their drive with a 41-yard touchdown run by Steven Jackson. On the ensuing Redskins drive, Donovan McNabb drove into Rams territory before Na'il Diggs forced a fumble on Santana Moss. James Butler, who was playing for an injured Craig Dahl picked up the fumbled and returned it 49 yards before being forced out of bounds. Bradford threw a three-yard touchdown pass to Daniel Fells to make the score 14–0. The Redskins tried to start their offense again, but after being stopped on third down had to punt. Graham Gano's punt was blocked however by Rams rookie wide receiver Dominique Curry, and the Rams took over in striking distance for another touchdown. Sam Bradford threw his first interception of the day, and the Redskins were able to take over again, and were able to score a field goal. On the kickoff after the Redskins field goal, Mardy Gilyard, the Rams rookie kick returner/wide receiver fumbled the ball, and the Redskins took over on the 21 yard line. Donovan McNabb hit Santana Moss for a touchdown the next play. Steven Jackson was injured on the next drive for the Rams, and the Rams were unable to score. The next drive the Redskins kicked another field goal to make the score 13–14. The Rams marched down the field one last time, but were stalled in the redzone. With 31 seconds left Josh Brown attempted a field goal, but the Redskins blocked the kick and at the half the Rams led 14–13. At the start of the second half, McNabb hit Moss for a 56-yard pass. The Rams kept the Redskins out of the endzone, and Washington settled for the go ahead field goal to make the score 16–14. The next drive St. Louis marched down the field, and Kenneth Darby, playing for an injured Steven Jackson scored his first TD of the year from 12 yards out to make the score 21–16. Redskins were unable to score during the fourth quarter however, and McNabb was picked off by Bradly Fletcher as he attempted a comeback. Josh Brown kicked three field goals in the final quarter to seal the Rams first victory of the year with a score of 30–16, snapping a 13-game home losing skid. This win also marked their highest scoring performance in a regular season game since their 34–14 victory over the Dallas Cowboys on October 19, 2008.

With the win, the Rams improved to 1–2.

Week 4: vs. Seattle Seahawks

The Rams' fourth game was played at home in an NFC west rivalry match against the  Seattle Seahawks. In the first quarter the Rams took the early lead as QB Sam Bradford completed a 15-yard TD pass to WR Brandon Gibson. The Seahawks cut the lead with kicker Olindo Mare nailing a 22-yard field goal, but the Rams increased their lead when kicker Josh Brown made a 30-yard field goal, followed in the 3rd quarter by Bradford completing a 21-yard TD pass to RB Kenneth Darby. Then Josh Brown made a 31-yard field goal.

With the victory, the Rams improved to 2–2, thus successfully improving on their previous season. The win also snapped a 10-game regular season losing streak to the Seahawks.

Week 5: at Detroit Lions

Hoping to increase their current winning streak the Rams flew to Ford Field for an NFC duel with the Lions. The Rams trailed early with kicker Jason Hanson making a 30-yard field goal, but the Rams replied with kicker Josh Brown making a 28-yard field goal. In the second quarter the Rams struggled as Hanson's kick was returned 105 yards to the endzone by WR Stefan Logan, followed by QB Shaun Hill making a 1-yard TD pass to WR Calvin Johnson. The Rams tried to cut the lead with Brown nailing another 28-yard field goal, but they continued to struggle when Hill found TE Brandon Pettigrew on a 3-yard TD pass and then in the 3rd quarter he found WR Nate Burleson on a 26-yard TD pass. In the fourth quarter the Rams had more problems when they gave up a 48 and a 47-yard field goal by Hanson and an interception by DB Alphonso Smith in which he returned 42 yards to the endzone for a touchdown.

With the loss, the Rams fell to 2–3.

Week 6: vs. San Diego Chargers

The Rams' sixth game was an Interconference duel against the San Diego Chargers inside their dome. In the first quarter the Rams took the early lead as kicker Josh Brown made a 39-yard field goal, followed by QB Sam Bradford completing a 38-yard TD pass to WR Danario Alexander. The Rams increased their lead in the 2nd quarter when RB Steven Jackson got a 7-yard TD run. The Chargers replied with kicker Nate Kaeding nailing a 41-yard field goal, followed in the third quarter by FB Mike Tolbert getting a 1-yard TD run. In the 4th quarter the Rams' lead increased again when Josh Brown hit a 48-yard field goal, but was cut when QB Philip Rivers made a 5-yard TD pass to WR Buster Davis.

With the win, the Rams improved to 3–3 snapping their 13-game losing streak against AFC Opponents.

Week 7: at Tampa Bay Buccaneers

The Rams' seventh game was an NFC duel against the Buccaneers at Raymond James Stadium. In the first quarter, the Rams trailed early as kicker Connor Barth made a 35-yard field goal. They eventually pulled ahead in the 2nd quarter when kicker Josh Brown made a 25-yard field goal, followed by QB Sam Bradford making a 5 and a 2-yard TD pass to WR Danny Amendola and TE Michael Hoomanawanui respectively. The 49ers decreased the lead with Barth nailing a 39-yard field goal. This was followed by his successful 53 and 38-yard field goals to go 17–12. In the fourth quarter the Rams suddenly fell behind with QB Josh Freeman making a 1-yard TD pass to RB Cadillac Williams. (With a failed 2-point conversion)

With the loss, the Rams fell to 3–4.

Week 8: vs. Carolina Panthers

The Rams 8th game was an NFC duel with the Panthers inside their dome. In the second quarter the Rams took the lead as kicker Josh Brown nailed a 33-yard field goal. This was followed by QB Sam Bradford completing a 2-yard TD pass to WR Danny Amendola. The Panthers replied with kicker John Kasay making a 44-yard field goal. The Rams increased their lead in the fourth quarter with Bradford finding TE Daniel Fells on a 23-yard TD pass, followed by Brown getting a 41-yard field goal. The Panthers responded with QB Matt Moore making a 17-yard TD pass to WR Brandon LaFell.

With the win, the Rams went into their bye week at 4–4.

Week 9: BYE

Week 10: at San Francisco 49ers

Coming off their bye week the Rams flew to Candlestick Park for an NFC West rivalry match against the 49ers. In the first quarter the Rams took the lead with kicker Josh Brown making a 42-yard field goal. They trailed with RB Frank Gore getting a 1-yard TD run. This was followed in the second quarter by kicker Joe Nedney nailing a 26-yard field goal. The Rams fought back and took the lead with QB Sam Bradford completing a 5-yard TD pass to WR Danny Amendola. Followed in the third quarter by RB Steven Jackson getting a 13-yard TD run. The 49ers got the lead back with Nedney getting a 47-yard field goal, followed by QB Troy Smith making a 16-yard TD pass to WR Michael Crabtree. Te Rams tied the game with Brown making a 33-yard field goal. The decision was made at overtime when Nedney successfully put away a 29-yard field goal to give the Rams a loss, bringing their record down to 4–5.

Week 11: vs. Atlanta Falcons

Hoping to rebound from their loss to the 49ers the Rams played inside their dome for an NFC duel with the Falcons. In the first quarter the Rams took the lead after QB Sam Bradford making a 25-yard TD pass to TE Michael Hoomanawanui. The Falcons replied with kicker Matt Bryant hitting a 42-yard field goal. The Rams increased their lead when kicker Josh Brown hit a 53-yard field goal. The lead didn't last long after QB Matt Ryan completed a 12-yard TD pass to WR Brian Finneran, followed by Bryant nailing a 29 and a 24-yard field goal. The Rams tried to cut the lead with Bradford making a 13-yard TD pass to WR Brandon Gibson, but they struggled further as Ryan threw a 2-yard TD pass to TE Justin Peelle. This was followed in the fourth quarter by Bryant nailing a 21-yard field goal, and with RB Michael Turner getting a 39-yard TD run.

With the loss, the Rams fell to 4–6.

Week 12: at Denver Broncos

Hoping to rebound from their loss to the Falcons the Rams flew to INVESCO Field at Mile High for an Inter-conference duel with the Broncos. In the first quarter the Rams trailed early as Knowshon Moreno got a 4-yard TD run, followed by kicker Matt Prater nailing a 49-yard field goal. They cut the lead down with QB Sam Bradford getting a 36-yard TD pass to TE Michael Hoomanawanui. The deficit increased as Prater made a 40-yard field goal. They pulled ahead with Bradford completing a 2 and a 26-yard TD pass to TE Billy Bajema, followed by kicker Josh Brown nailing a 28 and a 37-yard field goal. This was followed in the third quarter by RB Kenneth Darby getting a 1-yard TD run. The lead was narrowed with QB Kyle Orton making a 41-yard TD pass to Lloyd, but it was expanded after Brown got a 26-yard field goal. The Broncos tried to come back as Orton completed a 16 and a 5-yard TD pass to wide receivers Eddie Royal and Brandon Lloyd, but the Rams' defense held them on for the win.

With the win, the Rams improved to 5–6.

Week 13: at Arizona Cardinals

The Rams' twelfth game was a division rivalry match against the Cardinals. The Rams trailed early as kicker Jay Feely got a 45 and a 41-yard field goal. They soon pulled ahead after kicker Josh Brown hit a 28, 52 and 20-yard field goal. This was followed in the third quarter by RB Steven Jackson getting a 27-yard TD run, and with Brown making a 43-yard field goal.

With the win, the Rams improved to 6–6. They have won as many games this year as they have for the past three years, only winning a total of 6 games 2007–2009.

Week 14: at New Orleans Saints

Coming off their win over the Cardinals the Rams flew to Louisiana Superdome for an NFC duel with the Saints. The Rams trailed early as QB Drew Brees completed a 5 and a 17-yard TD pass to WR Marques Colston. The Rams then got on the board as kicker Josh Brown hit a 38 and a 45-yard field goal. Soon, they had more problems as QB Sam Bradford threw an interception to FS Malcolm Jenkins which was returned 96 yards for a touchdown. This was followed by Bress completing a 31-yard TD pass to WR Lance Moore, followed by kicker Garrett Hartley nailing a 40-yard field goal. The Rams would cut the lead down with Bradford scrambling a yard for a touchdown.

With the loss, the Rams fell to 6–7.

Week 15: vs. Kansas City Chiefs

Hoping to rebound from their loss to the Saints the Rams played inside their dome for an interconference duel with the Chiefs.
In the first quarter the Rams took the early lead as kicker Josh Brown nailed a 37 and a 52-yard field goal. They trailed with QB Matt Cassel throwing a 2-yard TD pass to TE Leonard Pope, which got worse as RB Jamaal Charles got a 2-yard TD run, followed by kicker Ryan Succop making a 53 and a 38-yard field goal. The Rams tried to break down the lead with RB Steven Jackson making a 5-yard TD run, but continued to struggle as RB Thomas Jones got a 2-yard TD run.

With the loss, the Rams fell to 6–8.

Week 16: vs. San Francisco 49ers

Hoping to break a two-game losing streak the Rams played inside their dome for a division rivalry rematch against the 49ers. The Rams took the lead after RB Steven Jackson got a 1-yard TD run, followed by DE James Hall tackling 49ers quarterback Troy Smith for a safety. The lead was narrowed when Ted Ginn Jr. returned a punt 78 yards for a touchdown, but the Rams increased their lead slightly with kicker Josh Brown nailing a 43-yard field goal. They trailed for the first time with Smith completing a 60-yard TD pass to WR Michael Crabtree. They got the lead back with Brown getting a 30-yard field goal, followed by QB Sam Bradford getting a 3-yard TD pass to WR Laurent Robinson. The lead was narrowed with kicker Jeff Reed nailing a 30-yard field goal, but the Rams pulled away with Brown making a 28-yard field goal.

With the win, the Rams improved to 7–8.

Week 17: at Seattle Seahawks

Coming off their win over the 49ers, the Rams flew to Qwest Field for a Week 17 NFC West rematch with the Seattle Seahawks,  with the division title on the line.  St. Louis trailed early in the first quarter as Seahawks quarterback Charlie Whitehurst completed a 4-yard touchdown pass to wide receiver Mike Williams.  The Rams answered in the second quarter with a 32-yard field goal from kicker Josh Brown.

St. Louis chopped away as their deficit in the third quarter with a 27-yard field goal from Brown, but Seattle replied with kicker Olindo Mare making a 31-yard field goal.  Afterwards, the Seahawks pulled away in the fourth quarter with Mare getting a 38-yard and a 34-yard field goal.

With the loss, the Rams' season came to an end at 7–9.

Standings

Staff

Final roster

References

External links
 NFL – St. Louis Rams Team Page
 St. Louis Rams – news, schedule, stats, scores, forums

St.Louis Rams
St. Louis Rams seasons
St Louis